Mushfig Huseynov (born 14 February 1970 is a retired Azerbaijani singular footballer. He made his professional debut in 1989 for Qarabağ FK.

Honours
 Azerbaijan Premier League winner: 1993	
 Azerbaijan Cup winner: 1993

External links
 
 

1970 births
Soviet footballers
Azerbaijani footballers
Azerbaijan international footballers
Azerbaijani expatriate footballers
Living people
Qarabağ FK players
Paykan F.C. players
People from Agdam
Soviet Azerbaijani people
FK MKT Araz players
Azerbaijan Premier League players
Association football forwards
Neftçi PFK players
Sportspeople from Agdam
Footballers from Agdam